Anthony Murphy (4 July 1950 – 13 October 2004) was an Irish Gaelic football player, selector, and administrator. He played for club side Carbery Rangers, divisional side Carbery and at the inter-county level with the Cork senior football team.

Career

Murphy first came to prominence as a member of the Carbery Rangers minor team that won three successive championships. His performances at the club level resulted in his inclusion on the Cork minor team that secured the All-Ireland title in 1968. Murphy progressed onto the Cork under-21 team and enjoyed three undefeated years at the provincial level before winning consecutive All-Ireland Under-21 Championships in 1970-71. By this stage, he had also been drafted onto the Cork senior team and made a number of appearances between 1971 and 1975. Murphy also won County Senior Championship titles with Carbery in 1968 and 1971 before ending his career with a number of divisional championship titles with Carbery Rangers. In retirement from playing he became involved in coaching, and was a selector with the Carbery Rangers team that won the County Junior Championship title in 2003.

Honours

Player

Carbery Rangers
South West Junior A Football Championship: 1980, 1984, 1987
West Cork Minor B Football Championship: 1966, 1967, 1968

Carbery
Cork Senior Football Championship: 1968, 1971

Cork
All-Ireland Junior Football Championship: 1972
Munster Junior Football Championship: 1972
All-Ireland Under-21 Football Championship: 1970, 1971
Munster Under-21 Football Championship: 1969, 1970, 1971
All-Ireland Minor Football Championship: 1968
Munster Minor Football Championship: 1968

Selector

Carbery Rangers
Cork Junior A Football Championship: 2003
South West Junior A Football Championship: 2003

References

1950 births
2004 deaths
Carbery Rangers Gaelic footballers
Carbery Gaelic footballers
Cork inter-county Gaelic footballers
Gaelic football selectors
Gaelic football managers
Gaelic games administrators
People from Rosscarbery